The River Nagavali also known as Langulya is one of the main rivers of Southern Odisha and North Andhra States in India, between Rushikulya and Godavari basins.

Origin and course
Nagavali River originates from a hill near Lakhbahal village in Thuamul Rampur block of Kalahandi District. It touches Nakrundi, Kerpai areas of Kalahandi, Kalyansinghpur and Rayagada of Rayagada district of Odisha and merged in Bay of Bengal near Kallepalli village near Srikakulam after crossing by the side of Srikakulam of Andhra Pradesh. It is an independent river with its own basin.

The river basin receives  average rainfall annually. The yearly water availability in the river basin at Narayanapuram barrage is 1.117 billion cubic meters on average. The uplands of the river basin are hilly areas with predominantly tribal populated. It drains parts of the Kalahandi, Rayagada and Koraput districts of Odisha and Srikakulam, Vizianagaram districts of Andhra Pradesh.

Tributaries
The main tributaries of the River Nagavali are  Jhanjavati, Barha, Baldiya, Satnala, Sitagurha, Srikona, Gumudugedda, Vottigedda, Suvarnamukhi, Vonigedda, Relligedda and Vegavati. The Suvarnamukhi river takes its birth in the hills of Salur mandal and takes an eastern direction and finally join the Nagavali at Sangam village in Vangara mandal of Srikakulam District. Vegavathi originates in pachipenta hills of Pachipenta Mandal.
Vegavathi River takes its origin in the Pachipenta hills in Eastern Ghats. It is a tributary to Suvarnamukhi, which in turn is a tributary to River Nagavali. Salur town and Paradhi are located on the banks of this river. There are two road bridges at these places.

Towns and cities
Jaykaypur: Nagavali river flows near to Jaykaypur. It has been one of the major source of water for companies like JK Paper Limited, a company of JK Organization.  
Rayagada town and district headquarters of Rayagada dist of Odisha, River Nagavali flows in outskirts of the town.
Srikakulam town, the district headquarters in Andhra Pradesh: River Nagavali flows through Srikakulam town and meets the sea at Kallepalli and Bonthalakoduru villages, 5 kilometers far from Srikakulam town.
Hatipathar, near Rayagada: It is a place of great scenic beauty with two waterfalls on the course of River Nagavali. The boulders here appear in a way that look like huge elephants.

Irrigation projects

Jhanjavati Project  is located at Rajyalaxmipuram village in Komarada mandal of Vizianagaram district on Jhanjavati, a tributary of River Nagavali. It is a rubber dam and first of its kind in Andhra Pradesh and India and the biggest in Asia. It was dedicated to the nation on 1 January 2006 by Chief Minister Y. S. Rajasekhara Reddy. The rubber dam was installed on a concrete plate in technical collaboration with Hydro-Construct of Austria. However, the prior agreement between Odisha and Andhra Pradesh on this project permits to increase the maximum reservoir level submerging Odisha area up to  msl. This dispute is unsettled till now preventing the use of the project's full irrigation potential for the last 20 years due to the 0.6 tmcft reservoir storage capacity against 4 tmcft planned storage. Andhra Pradesh wants to resolve the issue by constituting Nagavali water dispute tribunal under the Interstate River Water Disputes Act as the dispute is not getting settled by negotiations between the two states.
Thotapalli Barrage is located on Nagavali River at village Thotapalli in Vizianagaram district and presently being upgraded as barrage.
Madduvalasa Reservoir is located at Madduvalasa village in Vangara mandal of Srikakulam district. It is built across the Maddigedda tributary.
Vengalaraya Sagar  with twin reservoirs to supply irrigation water, is located on Suvarnamukhi sub-tributary in the upstream of Madduvalasa Reservoir.
Peddagadda reservoir  is also located on Peddagadda sub-tributary in the upstream of Madduvalasa Reservoir.
Narayanapuram barrage  is located in Burja mandal of Srikakulam district across Nagavali River.
It will run from Hiramandalam reservoir to Narayanapuram barrage near Amudalavalasa and bring an additional  of ayacut under irrigation using 10 tmcft of water from Vamsadhara basin.

Pumped storage hydropower projects
Nearly 9200 MW capacity pumped-storage hydropower plants can be installed using the existing reservoirs to meet the renewable and green power needs of the Uttara Andhra region.

See also

Vamsadhara River
Krishna Water Disputes Tribunal
Polavaram Project
Sriram Sagar Project
Nizam Sagar
Balimela Reservoir
Penner River
Palar River

References

External links

https://web.archive.org/web/20070101035619/http://vizianagaram.ap.nic.in/
https://web.archive.org/web/20071008221928/http://nwda.gov.in/writereaddata/sublink2images/104.pdf

Rivers of Odisha
Rivers of Andhra Pradesh
Inter-state disputes in India
Uttarandhra
Rivers of India